Irmulco is an unincorporated community in Mendocino County, California.

A post office operated at Irmulco from 1911 to 1927. The name comes from an initialism of the Irvine and Muir Lumber Company.

References

Unincorporated communities in California
Unincorporated communities in Mendocino County, California